Nicholas James Long (born October 6, 1989 in San Diego, California) is an American racing cyclist who represents the United States in BMX. He was selected to represent the United States at the 2012 Summer Olympics in the men's BMX event.

He also competed at the 2015 Pan American Games and the 2016 Summer Olympics.

References

External links
 
 
 
 
 
 

1989 births
Living people
BMX riders
American male cyclists
Olympic cyclists of the United States
Cyclists at the 2012 Summer Olympics
Cyclists at the 2016 Summer Olympics
Pan American Games medalists in cycling
Pan American Games silver medalists for the United States
Cyclists at the 2015 Pan American Games
Medalists at the 2015 Pan American Games